Mils bei Imst is a municipality in the Imst district and is located 5 km west of Imst. Thanks to a motorway tunnel the location is free of heavy traffic. Mils possesses a flood-meadow which is a popular recreation area.

Population

References

External links

Cities and towns in Imst District